Valmir Veliu (born 4 June 2000) is a Kosovan professional footballer who plays as a winger for Turkish club İstanbulspor, on loan from Gaziantep, and the Kosovo national team.

Club career

Llapi
On 18 June 2018, Veliu signed his first professional contract with Football Superleague of Kosovo side Llapi after agreeing to a three-year deal. On 29 September 2018, he made his debut in a 2–0 home win against KEK after coming on as a substitute of Festim Alidema.

Gaziantep
On 26 June 2022, Veliu signed a three-year contract with Süper Lig club Gaziantep. Gaziantep reportedly paid a €180 thousand transfer fee. On 6 August 2022, he made his debut in a 1–1 away draw against Sivasspor after coming on as a substitute at 64th minute in place of Lazar Marković.

International career
On 24 December 2019, Veliu received a call-up from Kosovo for the friendly match against Sweden, and made his debut after coming on as a substitute at 46th minute in place of Herolind Shala.

References

External links

Living people
2000 births
Sportspeople from Podujevo
Kosovan footballers
Kosovo under-21 international footballers
Kosovo international footballers
Association football wingers
Football Superleague of Kosovo players
KF Llapi players
Süper Lig players
Gaziantep F.K. footballers
İstanbulspor footballers